Frederick Aloys Hahn (February 16, 1929 – August 16, 1984) was an American professional baseball pitcher who worked in one game in Major League Baseball (MLB) for the St. Louis Cardinals in . Despite his brief MLB tenure, Hahn, a left-hander from Nyack, New York, had a 13-year (1947–1959) professional career.

In his lone big-league appearance, on April 19, 1952, at Wrigley Field, Hahn was called into the contest in the seventh inning with the Chicago Cubs in command, 6–0. He pitched the seventh and eighth innings and allowed two unearned runs, two hits and one base on balls. He spent the rest of 1952 at Triple-A Rochester.

References

External links

1929 births
1984 deaths
American people of German descent
Baseball players from New York (state)
Buffalo Bisons (minor league) players
Fresno Cardinals players
Houston Buffaloes players
Little Rock Travelers players
Lynchburg Cardinals players
Major League Baseball pitchers
Nyack Rocklands players
People from Nyack, New York
Rochester Red Wings players
St. Louis Cardinals players
Toronto Maple Leafs (International League) players